Tetrabothrius is a genus of flatworms belonging to the family Tetrabothriidae.

The genus has cosmopolitan distribution.

Species:

Tetrabothrius affinis 
Tetrabothrius argentinum 
Tetrabothrius arsenyevi 
Tetrabothrius baeri 
Tetrabothrius bairdi 
Tetrabothrius bassani 
Tetrabothrius campanulatus 
Tetrabothrius creani 
Tetrabothrius curilensis 
Tetrabothrius cylindraceus 
Tetrabothrius diomedea 
Tetrabothrius diplosoma 
Tetrabothrius drygalskii 
Tetrabothrius egregius 
Tetrabothrius erostris 
Tetrabothrius eudyptidis 
Tetrabothrius fallax 
Tetrabothrius filiformis 
Tetrabothrius forsteri 
Tetrabothrius fuhrmanni 
Tetrabothrius gracilis 
Tetrabothrius heteroclitus 
Tetrabothrius heterosoma 
Tetrabothrius hobergi 
Tetrabothrius hoyeri 
Tetrabothrius immerinus 
Tetrabothrius innominatus 
Tetrabothrius jaegerskioeldi 
Tetrabothrius jaegerskioldi 
Tetrabothrius jagerskioldi 
Tetrabothrius joubini 
Tetrabothrius kowalewskii 
Tetrabothrius laccocephalus 
Tetrabothrius lutzi 
Tetrabothrius macrocephalus 
Tetrabothrius mawsoni 
Tetrabothrius minor 
Tetrabothrius minutus 
Tetrabothrius morschtini 
Tetrabothrius mozambiquus 
Tetrabothrius nelsoni 
Tetrabothrius norvegicum 
Tetrabothrius pauliani 
Tetrabothrius pelecaniaquilae 
Tetrabothrius pellucidus 
Tetrabothrius peregrinatoris 
Tetrabothrius perfidus 
Tetrabothrius phalacrocoracis 
Tetrabothrius polyorchis 
Tetrabothrius porrigens 
Tetrabothrius priestleyi 
Tetrabothrius procerus 
Tetrabothrius reditus 
Tetrabothrius ruudi 
Tetrabothrius sarasini 
Tetrabothrius schaeferi 
Tetrabothrius shinni 
Tetrabothrius skoogi 
Tetrabothrius sphaerocephalum 
Tetrabothrius sulae 
Tetrabothrius torulosus 
Tetrabothrius umbrella 
Tetrabothrius wilsoni 
Tetrabothrius wrighti

References

Platyhelminthes